Halbury is a former railway town in South Australia, west of the Clare Valley, halfway between Balaklava and Auburn. At the 2006 census, Halbury had a population of 363.

Etymology
Halbury is situated in the Hundred of Hall, named after politician George Hall.

Railway 
Halbury was a stop on the Port Wakefield railway line, an isolated narrow gauge horse-drawn railway connecting to the port at Port Wakefield from Balaklava and Hoyleton. Halbury was where this railway crossed the Gulf Road from Auburn and Burra to the port.

The Gladstone railway line ran from Hamley Bridge through Balaklava to Blyth and further on into the Mid North of the state.  The line was originally narrow gauge , but was converted to broad gauge  in 1927. Due to various reasons, this particular line became obsolete and the tracks were dismantled in the late 1980s.  After Halbury, the railway line veered to the north-east, travelling on to the towns of Hoyleton, Kybunga and further north to Blyth.

The railway siding at Halbury was opened in 1870 and closed to all goods and parcels traffic in 1981. Station brand: "HY". Station code number 1274. Railway distance from Adelaide: 74 miles, 1 chain.

Shamus Liptrot Cycling Trail 
The former Halbury to Balaklava railway line was re-opened as a 12 km low-gradient cycling trail in 2016, named after elite junior local cyclist Shamus Liptrot who died in 2011, several years after suffering serious injuries in a cycling accident. The trail extends from Balaklava to Halbury, Shamus's home town. The trail is the central link of the 26 km Copper Trail, which extends from Leasingham in the Clare Valley, to Port Wakefield at the head of the Gulf St Vincent.

Railway Signboard Project 
In 2022, to commemorate the railway history of the area, a group of Christian railway enthusiasts reinstalled an exact replica of the original Halbury railway station sign.

The text on the plaque affixed to the sign reads: "This is the site of the Halbury railway siding, 74 Miles, 1 Chain. 1870 – 1981. Sign made and reinstalled Easter 2022 by J. Leigh and E. Green, Railway Infrastructure Services. This sign would not be here if not for Lorraine Zaharuiko, 1984-2021. John 3:16-21."

Government 
The township of Halbury in the west of the locality is in the Wakefield Regional Council local government area. The hillier east of the locality is part of the District Council of Clare and Gilbert Valleys.

Gallery

References

External links

Towns in South Australia